A dark star is a type of star that may have existed early in the universe before conventional stars were able to form and thrive. The stars would be composed mostly of normal matter, like modern stars, but a high concentration of neutralino dark matter present within them would generate heat via annihilation reactions between the dark-matter particles. This heat would prevent such stars from collapsing into the relatively compact and dense sizes of modern stars and therefore prevent nuclear fusion among the 'normal' matter atoms from being initiated.

Under this model, a dark star is predicted to be an enormous cloud of molecular hydrogen and helium ranging between 4 and 2,000 astronomical units in diameter and with a surface temperature and luminosity low enough that the emitted radiation would be invisible to the naked eye.

In the unlikely event that dark stars have endured to the modern era, they could be detectable by their emissions of gamma rays, neutrinos, and antimatter and would be associated with clouds of cold molecular hydrogen gas that normally would not harbor such energetic, extreme, and rare particles.

Notes on articles

Bibliography and References used
 
 
 

Star types
Star
Dark concepts in astrophysics